Netto Arena (2014–2017 Azoty Arena, Netto Arena since 2018) is an indoor arena in Szczecin, Poland. It opened on 1 August 2014, and holds 5,403 people.

Arena Szczecin hosts a variety of sports events, including basketball, volleyball, handball, indoor soccer, tennis, badminton, martial arts, fencing, sport gymnastics, pole jump.

References

External links
 Official site

Indoor arenas in Poland
Sport in Szczecin
Volleyball venues in Poland
Handball venues in Poland
Sports venues in West Pomeranian Voivodeship
Boxing venues in Poland
Mixed martial arts venues in Poland